The Candlemas Islands are a group of small uninhabited islands lying at the northern part of the South Sandwich Islands,  southeast of Visokoi Island. They consist of Candlemas Island and Vindication Island, divided by Nelson Channel, and numerous rocks.

The Candlemas Islands were discovered on February 2, 1775, by a British expedition under James Cook, who named them to commemorate the day of their discovery.

See also 
 List of Antarctic islands north of 60° S
 List of sub-Antarctic islands

References

External links
More volcanic information

Islands of the South Sandwich Islands
Volcanoes of the Atlantic Ocean
Volcanoes of South Georgia and the South Sandwich Islands